Flag sequence:  In data transmission or processing, a sequence of bits used to delimit, i.e. mark the beginning and end of a frame. 

Note 1:  An 8-bit sequence is usually used as the flag sequence; for example, the 8-bit flag sequence 01111110. 

Note 2:  Flag sequences are used in bit-oriented protocols, such as Advanced Data Communication Control Procedures (ADCCP), Synchronous Data Link Control (SDLC), and High-Level Data Link Control (HDLC).

References

Data transmission